Diamond and Related Materials is a peer-reviewed scientific journal in materials science covering research on all forms of diamond and other related materials, including diamond-like carbons, carbon nanotubes, graphene, and boron and carbon nitrides. The journal is published by Elsevier and the editor-in-chief is Ken Haenen (University of Hasselt).

Abstracting and indexing
The journal is abstracted and indexing in:

According to the Journal Citation Reports, the journal has a 2020 impact factor of 3.315.

References

External links

English-language journals
Materials science journals
Elsevier academic journals
Publications established in 1991